Camerton railway station was situated next to the River Derwent on the Cockermouth and Workington Railway. It served the village of Camerton, Cumberland (now Cumbria), England.

History
The station opened on 28 April 1847. It closed to regular passenger traffic on 3 March 1952, closing completely when the line closed on 18 April 1966.

In later years the by then DMU-operated 09:52 westbound from Carlisle (10:20 from Penrith) made a regular unadvertised Fridays Only call at the station, though there was no balancing call.

Industry
Camerton Colliery and Camerton Fireclay mine and associated brickworks were served by sidings which curved northwards off the through lines a short distance east of the station. Coal workings appear to have petered out in the 1930s, but the brickworks was a successful concern, with firebricks being a key requirement of Workington's furnaces. From 1939 the Admiralty established RNAD Broughton Moor on the CWJR's line north east of Camerton. A lesser-known ancillary of this was using the fireclay workings at Camerton as an ammunition store. This appears to have petered out in the 1950s, though Broughton Moor arms depot lasted until 1992.

Afterlife
By 2015 the station site was surrounded by nature.

See also

 Cockermouth, Keswick and Penrith Railway

References

Sources

Further reading

External links
Map of the line with photos, via RAILSCOT
The station on an OS map surveyed in 1864, via National Library of Scotland
The station on overlain OS maps surveyed from 1898, via National Library of Scotland
The station on a 1948 OS Map, via npe maps
The station, via Rail Map Online
The railways of Cumbria, via Cumbrian Railways Association
Photos of Cumbrian railways, via Cumbrian Railways Association
The railways of Cumbria, via Railways_of_Cumbria
Cumbrian Industrial History, via Cumbria Industrial History Society
Local history of the CKPR route, via Cockermouth
The line's and station's Engineer's Line References, via railwaycodes.org.uk
A video tour-de-force of the region's closed lines, via cumbriafilmarchive
West Cumberland Railtour 5 September 1954, via sixbellsjunction

Disused railway stations in Cumbria
Former London and North Western Railway stations
Railway stations in Great Britain opened in 1847
Railway stations in Great Britain closed in 1952
1847 establishments in England